Shahin Novrasli (born February 10, 1977) is an Azerbaijani jazz pianist, and composer

Early years

Childhood
Born in Baku, Azerbaijan, on 10 February 1977, Shahin is a descendant of celebrated 19th century Azerbaijani poet Mirza Alesker Novres. His father, professor Novras, and mother, economist Naila, instilled their sons with their own knowledgeable love for good music. At three years old, Shahin was already displaying an interest in music and rhythm. His first major public performance, aged 11, was in Azerbaijan State Philharmonic Hall for a symphony orchestra concert by composer Azer Rzayev. In Gulya Namazova’s class at music college, Shahin was a very serious student of classical music and displayed great skill in performing a huge range of works by Mozart, Bach, Chopin, Beethoven, Rachmaninov and other composers. This classical background is often to be heard in his jazz compositions but his love for American music - its jazz, rhythm, harmony - prevails. Combining all the musical skills, from playing to composing, jazz opened the way for Shahin to express his inner world, his music and it was not long in becoming the main focus of his creativity.

College and Music Academy
From 15 to 19 Shahin immersed himself in his favoured music, listening to the great pianists: Ahmad Jamal, Oscar Peterson, Bill Evans, Keith Jarrett, Chick Corea; all the while studying harmony and composition. Graduating from the Bulbul Music School, he moved on to the Azerbaijan State Music Academy. Here he also dedicated time to analysing the music of the legendary Azerbaijani jazz pianist Vagif Mustafazadeh, creator of a synthesis of jazz and traditional Azerbaijani Mugham music. Vagif’s compositions still feature in Shahin's repertoire.

Career

From 1997 he began to play in America and Europe in different formats: solo, trio, quartet…. There have also been experiments; adding different instruments to the group, including his own voice. Shahin has recorded three live albums: Live in Moscow, Live in Prague Castle and Jz'Mu, Live in Baku. There is also the experimental album Eternal Way, and Bayati, recorded while living and touring in America and released on the French Bee Jazz label. His detailed study of mugham added another ingredient to his compositions and concerts, furthering the mix of West and East.
Certainly a defining moment in Shahin’s work and career was his meeting with Ahmad Jamal. In 2014 in America, Shahin met Jamal’s manager Laura Hess-Hay; she introduced him to Ahmad Jamal, who rated his music highly and is to this day he representing Shahin to the world.

"He is one of the great pianists what I ever heard of" - Ahmad Jamal -

Jamal also co-produced his 2017 album "Emanation", which received UK Vibe award as "Best Jazz Albums of 2017", album was released on the French label Jazz Village, PIAS. In 2019, September 13 on Jazz Village,(PIAS) alongside Jamal's "Ballades" Shahin released his album " From Baku to New York City", produced by Ahmad Jamal.

Personal life
In 2007, Shahin married Natavan Novrasli, classical singer, an Honored Artist of Azerbaijan , soloist with the Azerbaijan State Academic Opera and Ballet Theater. They have two sons, born in 2008 and 2015.

Discography

References

External links
Official Shahin Novrasli website

1977 births
Azerbaijani jazz musicians
Musicians from Baku
Living people
Jazz composers
Azerbaijani jazz pianists
Baku Academy of Music alumni
21st-century pianists